Suchart Thada-Thamrongvech (born 8 August 1952) is a Thai politician and professor. He served Minister of Finance under Samak Sundaravej and Somchai Wongsawat from August to December 2008 and as Minister of Education in the Cabinet of Yingluck Shinawatra from January to October 2012. From September to November 2008, he was the chairman of the Pheu Thai Party.

Education 
He was educated at Thammasat University (BA, Economics) the London School of Economics (MSc, Economics) the University of East Anglia (Graduate Diploma in Economics), and McMaster University (PhD, Economics).

Academic rank 
 2009 Professor of Faculty of Economics in Ramkhamhaeng University

References 

1952 births
Living people
Alumni of the London School of Economics
Alumni of the University of East Anglia
McMaster University alumni
Suchart Thada-Thamrongvech
Suchart Thada-Thamrongvech
Suchart Thada-Thamrongvech
Suchart Thada-Thamrongvech
Suchart Thada-Thamrongvech
Suchart Thada-Thamrongvech
Suchart Thada-Thamrongvech